The list of Saab 340 operators lists former, military and current operators of the aircraft as of 2015.

Current operators

Civil operators

 
LADE
 
Link Airways
Pel-Air
Rex Airlines
 
Western Air
 
Pacific Coastal Airlines
Transwest Air
Pascan
 
Int'Air Îles
 
Cayman Airways
 
Air Rarotonga
 
NyxAir
Airest
 
Transportes Aéreos Guatemaltecos
 
Aerolíneas Sosa
 
Fleet Air
 
Hokkaido Air System
 
RAF-Avia
 
DOT LT
 
Air Chathams
 
Air Leap
 
SprintAir
 SkyTaxi
 
Seaborne Airlines
 
Solinair
 
One Caribbean
 
Air Leap
 
Lulutai Airlines
 
AeroJet
Air Urga
Mars RK
 
Cranfield University - National Flying Laboratory Centre
Loganair (ends mid 2023)
RVL Aviation
 
Ameriflight
Castle Aviation
IBC Airways
Silver Airways

Military operators

Argentine Air Force

Japan Coast Guard

Swedish Air Force
 
 Royal Thai Air Force

Former operators

 
 Andesmar
 Kaiken Líneas Aéreas
 LAER Línea Aérea Entre Ríos
 LAPA
 TAN Transportes Aéreos Neuquén
 TAPSA Transportes Aéreos Petroleros S.A
 SOL

 
 Hazelton Airlines
 Kendell Airlines
 
 Fairline 
 Robin Hood Aviation
 
 Calm Air
 Corporate Express Charter and Business Flightline Solutions
 Prince Edward Air
 Provincial Airlines
 Quebecair Express
 WestJet
 
 China Southern Airlines
 
 Aerotaca
 
Tus Airways
 
 Air Ostrava
 Job Air
 
 Caribair
 
 Timor Air

Estonian Air
 
Blue1
 Finnaviation
 Finncomm Airlines
 
 Air Åland
 
 Air Vendee
 Alsavia
 BritAir
 Europe Aero Service
 Regional Airlines
 Darta
 
 Nationale Regionale Transport
 
 Air Bremen
 City-Air
 Dauair 
 Deutsche BA
 OLT
 
 Transportes Aéreos Guatemaltecos
 
 Eastok Avia
 
 Aer Lingus
 
Japan Air Commuter
 
Kenya Airways
 
SkyBishkek
 
 RAF-Avia – cargo
 
 Avion Express
 FlyLAL
 Nordic Solutions Air
 
 Aerolitoral
 
 Eznis Airways
 
 Moldavian Airlines
 
 KLM Cityhopper
 Netherlines
 
 Air Nelson
 Kiwi Regional Airlines
 Vincent Aviation
 
 Norving
 Vildanden
 
Air Panama
 
 Direct Fly
 SkyTaxi
 SprintAir
 
 Fina Air
 
Carpatair
Direct Aero Services
 
Polet Airlines
 
 Adria Airways – cargo
 Tatra Air
 
 Avitrans Nordic
 Braathens Regional Airways
 Flying Enterprise
 NextJet
 Scandinavian Airlines
 Skyways
 SkyTaxi
 Swedair
 
 Crossair – launch customer
 
 SGA Airlines
 Happy Air
 
 Business Aviation Center
 Dniproavia
South Airlines
 
 Birmingham Executive Airways
 Business Air
 Manx Airlines
 
 Aurigny Air Services
 
 Air Midwest
 American Eagle Airlines
 Business Express
 Castle Aviation – Freighter launch customer
 Chicago Express
 Comair
 Express Airlines I/Pinnacle Airlines
 GLO Airlines
 Indiana University Foundation
 Mesaba Airlines
 National Airlines (5M)
 RegionsAir
 Shuttle America

References

340
340